Laurit Krasniqi (born 14 July 2001) is a Kosovan professional footballer who plays as a left-back for Belgian club Antwerp.

Club career
Krasniqi is a product of Antwerp with which he started playing at the age of 12 and played with all the youth teams of this team. On 2 April 2021, Krasniqi signed his first professional contract with first team after agreeing to a one-year deal with the possibility of extension. His senior debut with Antwerp came on 22 May 2022 in a 0–1 away win against Union SG after coming on as a substitute at 90th minute in place of Koji Miyoshi. On 28 July 2022, Krasniqi scored his first goal for Antwerp in his third appearance for the club in a 0–2 away win over Drita in 2022–23 UEFA Europa Conference League second qualifying round.

International career
In July 2022, through a private communication with a fan that was published on social networks, Krasniqi declared that he was waiting for an invitation from Kosovo. On 29 July 2022, the Football Federation of Kosovo announced that Krasniqi had decided to represent their country.

Personal life
Krasniqi was born in Ferizaj, and raised in England and Belgium to Kosovo Albanian parents.

References

External links

2001 births
Living people
People from Ferizaj
Association football fullbacks
Kosovan footballers
Belgian footballers
Belgian people of Kosovan descent
Belgian people of Albanian descent
Belgian Pro League players
Royal Antwerp F.C. players